Joseph Cirella (born May 9, 1963) is a Canadian former professional ice hockey player who played in 828 games in the National Hockey League (NHL). He has additionally served as assistant coach and assistant general manager of the Oshawa Generals of the Ontario Hockey League. Cirella was born in Hamilton, Ontario, but grew up in Stoney Creek, Ontario.

Playing career
Cirella joined the Oshawa Generals of the Ontario Hockey League (OHL) at the age of 17 and served as team captain as the Generals won the J. Ross Robertson Cup as OHL champions in 1983. He was selected fifth overall in the 1981 NHL Entry Draft by the Colorado Rockies.

Cirella played for the Rockies, New Jersey Devils, Quebec Nordiques, New York Rangers, Florida Panthers and Ottawa Senators during an NHL career that lasted 14 seasons. He scored the first goal, and also registered an assist on the game-winning goal in the 36th National Hockey League All-Star Game, played in his home arena in East Rutherford, New Jersey, in 1984. He was the last former Colorado Rockies player in the NHL at the time of his final game. He retired in 1997 after playing one year in Germany with the Kölner Haie of the Deutsche Eishockey Liga.

Career statistics

Regular season and playoffs

International

Coaching
After retiring as a player, Cirella served as an assistant coach with the NHL's Florida Panthers during the 1997-98 season before returning to the Ontario Hockey League where he served in the same capacity with the Oshawa Generals for five seasons. After spending the 2009-10 season in the Peterborough Petes' front office, he returned to the Generals as assistant general manager and assistant coach.

References

External links
Joe Cirella's Hockey Camps

1963 births
Canadian people of Italian descent
Colorado Rockies (NHL) draft picks
Colorado Rockies (NHL) players
Florida Panthers coaches
Florida Panthers players
Ice hockey people from Ontario
Kölner Haie players
Living people
Milwaukee Admirals (IHL) players
National Hockey League All-Stars
National Hockey League first-round draft picks
New Jersey Devils players
New York Rangers players
Oshawa Generals players
Ottawa Senators players
Quebec Nordiques players
Sportspeople from Hamilton, Ontario
Canadian ice hockey defencemen
Canadian ice hockey coaches